Gümüşhane is a city and the capital district of Gümüşhane Province, Turkey.

Gümüşhane means "silver house" in Turkish. It may refer to:

 Gümüşhane Province, a province of Turkey
 Gümüşhane Airport, in the province
 Gümüşhane University, in the city
 Gümüşhanespor, a sports club based in the city
 Gümüşhane, Ardanuç, a village in the district of Ardanuç, Artvin Province, Turkey